The Canon EOS 60D is an 18.1 megapixels semi-pro digital single-lens reflex camera made by Canon. It was announced on August 26, 2010, with a suggested retail price of US$1099.00. As a part of the Canon EOS two-digit line, it is the successor of the EOS 50D and is the predecessor of the EOS 70D.

It is the first  camera which has an articulating LCD screen. Apart from its screen, the main new features of the 60D in the two-digit Canon line include increased resolution and ISO range, full-HD video capabilities, and in-camera post-processing functions for the images. However, it uses the DIGIC 4 image processor.

Like the 50D, the camera has an LCD of settings on the top of the camera where the ISO, AF-Mode, Shooting mode, and metering mode can be controlled.

The 60D is offered for purchase as a body alone or in a package with an EF-S 18-200mm f/3.5-5.6 IS lens, EF-S 17–85mm f/4-5.6 IS USM lens, EF-S 18–135mm f/3.5-5.6 IS lens, EF-S 17-55mm f/2.8 IS USM lens, or an EF-S 18–55mm f/3.5–5.6 lens

Features

Compared to the EOS 50D, the following changes have been made, including:
 Resolution increase to 18.1 megapixels APS-C CMOS Sensor (50D has 15.1 megapixels).
 Maximum sensitivity increased to ISO 6400 (12800 as optional expanded setting) (50D has max 3200 ISO, with 6400 and 12800 as optional expanded settings).
 Video recording, with same controls as the 550D/Rebel T2i.
 1080p Full HD video recording at 24p, 25p and 30p with drop frame timing.
 720p HD video recording at 50p (50 Hz) and 60p (59.94 Hz).
 480p ED video recording at 50p (50 Hz) and 60p (59.94 Hz).
 Manual control of audio recording (same as newer firmware on 5D MkII).
 Articulating screen (3.0”) with a slightly higher resolution of 1,040,000 pixels, 288 ppi, in 3:2 ratio (50D has 4:3).
 The 60D screen, unlike that of the 50D, matches the aspect ratio of the sensor.
 Lower maximum burst frame rate of 5.3 fps (50D maximum is 6.3 fps).
 SD/SDHC/SDXC card slot (50D uses CompactFlash).
 Smaller and lighter polycarbonate resin with glass fibre on aluminium chassis (50D has magnesium alloy body).
 Wireless Speedlite control.
 Lack of AF micro-adjustment feature (included in 50D).
 Redesign of controls – multi-controller has been relocated to center of quick control dial; top buttons of 60D control only one setting.
 Locking mode dial.
 Electronic level that can be viewed in the viewfinder, rear LCD monitor, and top LCD panel.
 LP-E6 battery, as used in the 5D MkII and 7D.
 Lack of PC socket for flash synchronization.
 External shutter release port changed from 'Canon N3' socket to 3/32" (2.5mm) TRS pin.
 In-camera raw development and built-in creative filters and special effects.
 External 3.5mm stereo microphone jack

Digital Photography Review described the changes as representing the move from 'semi-pro'/'prosumer' to 'enthusiast' due to the reduction in some features; however the pentaprism viewfinder and iconic rear control wheel remain, as does the top informational LCD. The slightly smaller body retains the grip of the two-digit Canon line.

Gallery

EOS 60Da

Canon announced a modified version of the EOS 60D for astrophotography on April 3, 2012, called the EOS 60Da. The 60Da is the successor to the EOS 20Da. It was expected to cost $1,499. The camera has a modified infrared filter and a low-noise sensor with heightened hydrogen-alpha (H-alpha) sensitivity for improved capture of red hydrogen emission nebulae.  The 60Da is three times as sensitive to H-alpha light as the 60D  to allow for better images of nebulae.

References

External links

 Canon USA 60D Press release
 Canon 60D Review
 DPReview 60D Preview
 DPReview 60D Review
 Deciding on Buying a Canon 60D – Features
 Canon 60D Review – ZTech

60D
Live-preview digital cameras
Cameras introduced in 2010

ja:キヤノン EOS 10D#EOS 60D